Sumbe, formerly Novo Redondo, is a city located in west central Angola. It is the administrative capital of Cuanza Sul Province. In 2014 its population was 279,968.

Climate
The city has a dry tropical climate. The hottest temperatures are from January to April, and the coldest months are July and August.

Transportation
Air transportation is serviced by Angola Air Services, SAL, and Inter Transit.

See also
List of lighthouses in Angola

References

Populated places in Cuanza Sul Province
Municipalities of Angola
Provincial capitals in Angola
Lighthouses in Angola